Mohammed Saeed Nawed (1926 - 2010)  was an Eritrean leader and the creator of the Eritrean Liberation Movement (ELM), and is one of the prominent names in the cultural and political Eritrea.

Death
Nawed died on September 16, 2010. in Asmara upon his return from Kuwait.

References

1926 births
2010 deaths
Eritrean politicians